Wide Sound  is an Italian jazz label.

Artists who have recorded for the label include Norah Jones, Roberto Gatto, Irio De Paula, Marco Di Meco, Peter Erskine, Danilo Rea, Maurizio Rolli,  Angelo Valori, Fabrizio Bosso,  Paolo Di Sabatino, Luca Mannutza, Fabio Morgera, Stefano di Battista, Bruce Cox, Krystle Warren, Josh Roseman.

References

External links
Official site

Italian record labels
Jazz record labels